The Maendeleo Chap Chap Party (MCC) is a political party in Kenya.

History
The MCC was established by Alfred Mutua, Governor of Machakos County, on 25 August 2016. In the 2017 general elections the party endorsed incumbent President Uhuru Kenyatta, also winning four seats in the National Assembly.

References

External links
Official website

Political parties in Kenya
2016 establishments in Kenya
Political parties established in 2016